Helga Moreira is a Portuguese poet. She was born in Guarda on April 29, 1950.

She has lived in Porto since 1968. She published her first book in 1978 and many of her poems have appeared in various magazines.

Works

Poetry

 1978 Cantos do Silêncio
 1980 Fogo Suspenso
 1983 Quem não vier do sul
 1985 Aromas
 1996 Os Dias Todos Assim
 2001 Um Fio de Noite
 2002 Desrazões
 2003 Tumulto
 2006 Agora que falamos de morrer

References

1950 births
Living people
Portuguese women poets
20th-century Portuguese poets
People from Guarda, Portugal
People from Porto
21st-century Portuguese poets
20th-century Portuguese women writers
21st-century Portuguese women writers